Rebecca Henderson (born 1980) is a Canadian actress.

Life and career 
Henderson was born and raised in Canada. She moved to New York for college, and holds an M.F.A. from Columbia University.

Henderson is known for her portrayal of Lizzy on the Netflix series Russian Doll, the quirky and endearing overall-clad lesbian best friend who quickly became a fan favorite. Of the role, she shared "I’m a real caretaker with my wife and my friends. That’s probably the biggest overlap between me and Lizzy."

She is also known for her roles in independent films Appropriate Behavior, They Remain, and Mickey and the Bear. In October 2019, it was announced that Henderson would star alongside Sigourney Weaver and Kevin Kline in Amblin Partners’ feature The Good House. In 2021, she joined the main cast of Freeform's Single Drunk Female as Olivia, a "brilliant melancholic lesbian" and accoladed journalist. She joined cast of the Hulu comedy Sex Appeal in April 2021.

Filmography

Film

Television

Videogames

Awards and honors 
Henderson received a Drama Desk Award for Outstanding Ensemble performance in Signature Theatre’s 2015 revival of “The Wayside Motor Inn” by A.R. Gurney.

Personal life 
Henderson identifies as a lesbian. In 2016, Henderson married writer-director Leslye Headland. They reside in New York. She is best friends with Katherine Waterston.

References

External links 
 

21st-century Canadian actresses
Living people
1980 births
Columbia University alumni
Canadian lesbian actresses
21st-century Canadian LGBT people